was a village located in Tsukuba District, Ibaraki Prefecture, Japan.

As of 2003, the village had an estimated population of 15,427 and a density of 459.14 persons per km2. The total area was 33.60 km2.

On March 27, 2006, Yawara, along with the town of Ina (also from Tsukuba District), was merged to create the city of Tsukubamirai.

External links 
Official website of Tsukubamirai 

Dissolved municipalities of Ibaraki Prefecture